KWHL (106.5 FM, "K-Whale") is a commercial active rock music radio station in Anchorage, Alaska.  Owned by Alpha Media LLC, its studios are located in Anchorage (two blocks west of Dimond Center), and its transmitter is in the Bayshore neighborhood in South Anchorage.

External links

1982 establishments in Alaska
Active rock radio stations in the United States
Alpha Media radio stations
Radio stations established in 1982
WHL